ROH Rising Above was a professional wrestling pay-per-view (PPV) event produced by Ring of Honor.

Events

References

External links
ROH Wrestling.com

 
Recurring events established in 2007
Recurring events disestablished in 2008